Henri Delerue (14 November 1939 – 9 January 2016) is a French racewalker. He competed at the 1960, 1964 and the 1968 Summer Olympics.

References

1939 births
2016 deaths
Athletes (track and field) at the 1960 Summer Olympics
Athletes (track and field) at the 1964 Summer Olympics
Athletes (track and field) at the 1968 Summer Olympics
French male racewalkers
Olympic athletes of France
Place of birth missing